The Optical Media Board (OMB, formerly known as the Videogram Regulatory Board (VRB), is a Philippine government agency that is part of the Office of the President of the Philippines, responsible for regulating the production, use and distribution of recording media in the Philippines.

Background
The Optical Media Board was formed on October 5, 1985 by virtue of Presidential Decree No. 1987 as the Videogram Regulatory Board (VRB).

On April 17, 2001, the VRB was transferred from the Office of the President to the Department of Trade and Industry (DTI).

Under Republic Act No. 9239 signed by President Gloria Macapagal Arroyo on February 10, 2004, the Videogram Regulatory Board was transferred back to the Office of the President and renamed and reorganized as the Optical Media Board (OMB) in response to the increasing popularity of Video CD and DVD players in the country during the early 2000s, and consequently the widespread piracy of optical media such as CDs, DVDs and Blu-ray discs. It has conducted numerous raids on flea market stalls and similar establishments selling bootleg media including pirated CDs and DVDs.

History
In the early 2000s, raids by the VRB on illegal video establishments increased under the chairmanship of actor Ramon "Bong" Revilla Jr., who lead a strict anti-piracy campaign nationwide.

List of chairpersons

References

External links

1985 establishments in the Philippines
Government agencies established in 1985
Government agencies under the Office of the President of the Philippines
Mass media in the Philippines
Establishments by Philippine presidential decree